The New Forest Act 1697 (9 Will 3 c 33) was an Act of the Parliament of England which provided that "Waste Lands" in the New Forest be enclosed and planted with trees to supply timber for the ships of the Royal Navy.

Provisions
Of the total area of the Forest, estimated at 85454 acres, 1000 acres was to be enclosed "forthwith", a further 1000 acres in 1699, and thereafter 200 acres annually for 20 years. No trees could be felled in the lands without the Navy's approval; timber not claimed by the Navy would be auctioned in nearby towns. After 1716, locals on lands adjoining the enclosures would be permitted to graze animals and gather firewood on the same basis as in Elizabeth I's reign.

Repeal
The whole Act was repealed by section 1(4) of, and the Schedule to, the Wild Creatures and Forest Laws Act 1971.

See also
English land law
New Forest Act 1800

Notes

References
 
 Halsbury's Statutes

External links
 Original text as enacted, History of Parliament Trust

Acts of the Parliament of England
1697 in England
1697 in law
English forest law
New Forest
History of the Royal Navy